Rahul Shukla (born 28 August 1990) is an Indian first-class cricketer from Jaunpur district who plays for Jharkhand in domestic cricket. He is a right-arm fast-medium bowler. He was part of the Mumbai Indians squad from 2010 to 2012. He was signed up by the Rajasthan Royals in 2013.

In a match played between Rajasthan Royals and Otago Volts in CLT20 on 1 October 2013, he was named man of the match for taking 3 wickets. In February 2019, in the 2018–19 Syed Mushtaq Ali Trophy, he took his first five-wicket haul in a T20 match.

References

External links 
Player Profile at Cricinfo
Rahul Shukla's profile page on Wisden

1990 births
Living people
Indian cricketers
Jharkhand cricketers
Mumbai Indians cricketers
Rajasthan Royals cricketers
Cricketers from Bihar